Shirley Grey (born Agnes Zetterstrand; April 11, 1902 – August 12, 1981) was an American actress. She appeared in more than 40 films between 1930 and 1935.

Biography
Born in Naugatuck, Connecticut, Grey was the daughter of E. A Zetterstrand, a minister, who died when she was eight years old. Thereafter, her mother raised Grey and her six siblings. She graduated from Waterbury High School, where she was active in the Dramatic Club.

Grey began her acting career with the Poli Players. She went on to act with companies in New Orleans, Louisiana; Jacksonville, Florida; San Francisco, California, and Nova Scotia. She had her own acting troupe, the Shirley Grey Players, in the late 1920s. In 1931, she starred in the comedy-drama Chicago at the Fulton Theater in Oakland, California. It was the third play of Grey's "limited season".

Grey's work in stock theater led to her career in films. A talent scout who worked for film producer Samuel Goldwyn saw Grey performing in a stock production in Oakland and arranged for her to take a screen test, which led to her signing a contract with Goldwyn.

On August 28, 1921, Grey married actor Foster Williams, known professionally as Frank McCarthy. She filed for divorce from him on September 30, 1925. In 1936, Grey married English actor Arthur Margetson, who died in 1951.

In her later years, Grey was a semi-recluse, living with her sisters before moving to a Jacksonville Beach, Florida, convalescent home where she died.

Partial filmography

 The Golf Specialist (1930, Short) - House Detective's Wife (uncredited)
 The Public Defender (1931) - Barbara Gerry
 Secret Service (1931) - Miss Edith Varney
 Air Eagles (1931) - Eve
 One Man Law (1932) - Grace Duncan
 Texas Cyclone (1932) - Helen Rawlings
 The Riding Tornado (1932) - Patsy Olcott
 Get That Girl (1932) - Ruth Dale
 The Hurricane Express (1932) - Gloria Martin / Gloria Stratton
 Cornered (1932) - Jane Herrick
 Drifting Souls (1932) - Greta Janson
 Back Street (1932) - Francine
 Virtue (1932) - Gert
 Uptown New York (1932) - Patricia Smith
 Treason (1933) - Joan Randall
 From Hell to Heaven (1933) - Winnie Lloyd
 Private Jones (1933) - Helen Jones
 Out All Night (1933) - Kate
 Terror Aboard (1933) - Lili Kingston
 The Little Giant (1933) - Edith Merriam
 The Girl in 419 (1933) - Nurse Irene Blaine
 The Life of Jimmy Dolan (1933) - Goldie West
 Don't Bet on Love (1933) - Goldie Williams
 Too Much Harmony (1933) - Lilyan
 Hold the Press (1933) - Edith White
 Murder on the Campus (1933) - Lillian Voyne
 Twin Husbands (1933) - Chloe Werrenden
 Bombay Mail (1934) - Beatrice Jones aka Sonia Smeganoff
 I Like It That Way (1934) - Peggy
 Sisters Under the Skin (1934) - Gilda Gordon
 The Crime of Helen Stanley (1934) - Betty Lane
 One Is Guilty (1934) - Sally Grey
 Green Eyes (1934) - Jean Kester
 The Defense Rests (1934) - Mabel Wilson
 His Greatest Gamble (1934) - Bernice Solon
 Beyond the Law (1934) - Helen Glenn
 Girl in Danger (1934) - Gloria Gale
 Wednesday's Child (1934) - Louise
 Transatlantic Merry-Go-Round (1934) - Anya Rosson
 Public Opinion (1935) - Joan Nash
 Circumstantial Evidence (1935) - Adrienne Grey
 The People's Enemy (1935) - Ann Griffin
 The Girl Who Came Back (1935) - Gilda Gillespie aka Mary Brown
 The Public Menace (1935) - Mimi LaVerne
 The Mystery of the Mary Celeste (1935) - Sarah Briggs

References

External links
 
 

1902 births
1981 deaths
American film actresses
Actresses from Connecticut
20th-century American actresses
People from Naugatuck, Connecticut
People from Jacksonville Beach, Florida
American stage actresses
Western (genre) film actresses